Cylindrepomus nigrofasciatus is a species of beetle in the family Cerambycidae. It was described by Blanchard in 1853. It contains the varietas Cylindrepomus nigrofasciatus var. fulvithorax.

References

Dorcaschematini
Beetles described in 1853